The Branson Building in Alva, Oklahoma is a Plains Commercial-style building which was built in 1905.  It was listed on the National Register of Historic Places in 1984.

It is a two-story business block, with a flat roof bordered by a brick frieze.  Second-story windows are framed by pilasters;  first-story windows are tall, consistent with the high ceilings inside.  There is a corner entrance on the diagonal.

References

Commercial buildings on the National Register of Historic Places in Oklahoma
Commercial buildings completed in 1905
Buildings and structures in Woods County, Oklahoma
National Register of Historic Places in Woods County, Oklahoma
1905 establishments in Oklahoma Territory